Jana gaitea is a moth in the family Eupterotidae. It was described by Stoneham in 1966. It is found in Africa.

References

Moths described in 1966
Janinae